Bankisus is a genus of antlions belonging to the family Myrmeleontidae.

The species of this genus are found in Southern Africa.

Species:

Bankisus antiatlasensis 
Bankisus carinifrons 
Bankisus elegantulus 
Bankisus maculosus 
Bankisus oculatus 
Bankisus sparsus 
Bankisus triguttatus

References

Myrmeleontidae
Myrmeleontidae genera